Brian Lenihan may refer to:
 Brian Lenihan Snr (1930–1995), long-serving Irish Fianna Fáil politician
 His son Brian Lenihan Jnr (1959–2011), also an Irish Fianna Fáil politician
 Brian Lenihan (footballer) (born 1994), played for Hull City and Cork City.